Jacqueline "Jackie" Goldberg (born November 18, 1944) is an American politician and teacher serving as a member of the Los Angeles Unified School District Board of Education for the 5th district.

Early life and education 
Goldberg was born in the Los Angeles area on November 18, 1944. Goldberg attended the University of California, Berkeley, where she was a member of SLATE and a major contributor to the Free Speech Movement. She went on to earn a master's degree in education from the University of Chicago. Goldberg is Jewish.

LAUSD Board of Education 
In 1983, Goldberg was elected to the LAUSD Board of Education, where she served for two terms. In 2019, Goldberg announced that she would be running to be a member of the Board, this time for the fifth district after its previous member, Ref Rodriguez, left due to an accounting scandal. She faced Heather Repenning and was re-elected to the LAUSD's Board of Education.

Personal life 
Goldberg is openly lesbian. She married longtime partner Sharon Stricker in 2008; they have resided together in Echo Park since 1967. Together they have a son, Brian Stricker Goldberg. She is a member of the Democratic Socialists of America.

Elections

Los Angeles City Council

California State Assembly

Los Angeles Unified School District

References

External links
1999 National Security Archive Interview with Jackie Goldberg

1944 births
Living people
Free speech activists
Members of the California State Assembly
Los Angeles City Council members
Lesbian politicians
LGBT state legislators in California
LGBT Jews
Democratic Socialists of America politicians from California
Jewish American state legislators in California
University of California, Berkeley alumni
University of Chicago alumni
Women state legislators in California
Women city councillors in California
21st-century American politicians
21st-century American women politicians
21st-century American Jews